Gulick is a surname, originally of Dutch origin, as 'van Gulick'. Notable people with the surname include:
Alice Gordon Gulick (1847-1903), American missionary and educator
Amy Gulick, American photographer
Bill Gulick (1916–2013), American writer and historian
Charles T. Gulick (1841–1897), Hawaiian Kingdom politician
Denny Gulick, American mathematician
Esther Gulick (1911–1995), American environmentalist
Frances Gulick (1891–1936), American YMCA worker
J. T. Gulick (1832–1923), American missionary and naturalist
Luther Gulick (disambiguation), multiple people
Merle Gulick (1906–1976), American football player
Peter Johnson Gulick (1796–1877), American missionary
Sidney Gulick (1860–1945), American missionary

See also
Van Gulik